The Metropolitan Region of Vale do Paraíba e Litoral Norte is an administrative division of the state of São Paulo in Brazil. It was created in 2012. It takes its name from the Paraíba Valley and the northern coast of São Paulo state. Its seat is in São José dos Campos, the most populous municipality in the region. It consists of the following municipalities:
 
Aparecida
Arapeí
Areias
Bananal
Caçapava
Cachoeira Paulista
Campos do Jordão
Canas
Caraguatatuba
Cruzeiro
Cunha
Guaratinguetá
Igaratá
Ilhabela
Jacareí
Jambeiro
Lagoinha
Lavrinhas
Miguela
Monteiro Lobato
Natividade da Serra
Paraibuna
Pindamonhangaba
Piquete 
Potim
Queluz
Redenção da Serra
Roseira
Santa Branca
Santo Antônio do Pinhal
São Bento do Sapucaí
São José do Barreiro
São José dos Campos
São Luiz do Paraitinga
São Sebastião
Silveiras
Taubaté
Tremembé
Ubatuba

References

Vale do Paraiba e Litoral Norte